Events from 1985 in England

Incumbent

Events

January

February

March

April

May

June

July

August

September

October
 6 October – PC Keith Blakelock is fatally stabbed during the Broadwater Farm Riot in Tottenham, London. Two of his colleagues are treated in hospital for gunshot wounds, as are three journalists.

November

December

Births
Lewis Hamiton 7 January

Deaths

See also
1985 in Northern Ireland
1985 in Scotland
1985 in Wales

References

 
England
Years of the 20th century in England
1980s in England